Lily of da Valley is the fourth full-length album by Japanese rap rock group Dragon Ash; released in 2001. The album was preceded by the release of three singles, including "Shizuka na Hibi no Kaidan o", which was used as the ending theme for the 2000 film Battle Royale. The limited edition features "Episode 2" featuring Shun and Shigeo as a bonus track. The album also contains the hidden track "Hanakotoba".

In the language of flowers, lily of the valley represents the return of happiness.

Critical reception 
Ted Mills of AllMusic called the album a step down from Dragon Ash's preceding album Viva la Revolution (1999), writing that it was disappointing that the band's success following that album had "narrowed their focus" into making either "hardcore metal/hip-hop" tracks like "Let Yourself Go, Let Myself Go", or "soulful hip-hop" tracks with "female backing vocals" that follow the formula of another of their hits, "Grateful Days". While conceding that this does not mean the tracks "aren't exciting", Mills concluded it did mean that "the group has decided to turn the amps up to 11 without moving ahead".

Commercial performance 
Lily of da Valley debuted at number two on the Oricon Albums Chart, and was the 28th best-selling album of 2001 in Japan. It was eventually certified double platinum by the Recording Industry Association of Japan in March 2001, for shipments of 800,000 copies.

Track listing 
All songs written by Kenji Furuya unless otherwise stated.

"Intro" (Bots) – 1:08
"21st Century Riot" – 2:37
"Glory" – 5:00
"Amploud" – 4:16
"Bring It" – 4:32
"Sunset Beach" – 5:22
"My Friends' Anthem" – 3:07
"Yuri no Saku Basho De" (百合の咲く場所で) – 3:54
"Aim High" – 3:40
"Revolater" – 3:24
"Deep Impact" featuring Rappagariya, Yamadaman, Q,  – 4:32
"Shizuka na Hibi no Kaidan o" (静かな日々の階段を) – 4:29
"Lily of da Valley" – 5:53
"Outro" (Bots) – 1:17
"Hanakotoba" (花言葉) (hidden track) – 8:45

Limited edition 
The limited edition version of the album features a bonus track added after "Outro", with "Hanakotoba" attached to the end of the track.

"Episode 2" featuring Shun & Shigeo from  – 2:42

Charts

Weekly charts

Year-end charts

Certifications

References 

Dragon Ash albums
2001 albums
Victor Entertainment albums